Hillcrest Park is a public park in Vancouver, British Columbia.

Hillcrest Park may also refer to:

Hillcrest Park (Fullerton), a park in Fullerton, California
Hillcrest Park (Thunder Bay), a park in Thunder Bay, Ontario

See also
Hillcrest Park Archway, an archway in Clovis, New Mexico
Hillcrest Park Cemetery, a cemetery in Springfield, Massachusetts